Stay Alive is the debut solo studio album by American singer-songwriter Laura Jane Grace, released on October 1, 2020, through Polyvinyl Record Co. The album was written and recorded during the COVID-19 pandemic, when Grace was left without the ability to record with her band Against Me!, and thus made a solo album instead. The album was recorded over three days in Steve Albini's studio in Chicago. Stay Alive was released as a surprise album with no promotion, but music videos were released for "The Swimming Pool Song", "Blood & Thunder", and "SuperNatural Possession".

Track listing

References

2020 debut albums
Laura Jane Grace albums
Power pop albums by American artists
Albums about the COVID-19 pandemic
Albums impacted by the COVID-19 pandemic
Polyvinyl Record Co. albums